The Constitution of the United States does not require that any federal judges have any particular educational or career background, but the work of the Court involves complex questions of law – ranging from constitutional law to administrative law to admiralty law – and consequentially, a legal education has become a de facto prerequisite to appointment on the United States Supreme Court. Every person who has been nominated to the Court has been an attorney.

Before the advent of modern law schools in the United States, justices, like most attorneys of the time, completed their legal studies by "reading law" (studying under and acting as an apprentice to more experienced attorneys) rather than attending a formal program. The first Justice to be appointed who had attended an actual law school was Levi Woodbury, appointed to the Court in 1846. Woodbury had attended Tapping Reeve Law School in Litchfield, Connecticut, the most prestigious law school in the United States in that day, prior to his admission to the bar in 1812. However, Woodbury did not earn a law degree. Woodbury's successor on the Court, Benjamin Robbins Curtis, who received his law degree from Harvard Law School in 1832, and was appointed to the Court in 1851, was the first Justice to bear such a credential.

Associate Justice James F. Byrnes, whose short tenure lasted from June 1941 to October 1942, was the last Justice without a law degree to be appointed; Stanley Forman Reed, who served on the Court from 1938 to 1957, was the last sitting Justice from such a background. In total, of the 114 justices appointed to the Court, 49 have had law degrees, an additional 18 attended some law school but did not receive a degree, and 47 received their legal education without any law school attendance.

Currently serving justices are listed in bold below.

Four or more justices
 Harvard Law School – 22 alumni; 18 graduates
Harry Blackmun
Louis Brandeis
William J. Brennan Jr.
Stephen Breyer
Henry Billings Brown – also studied law at Yale, did not receive law degree from either
Harold Hitz Burton
Benjamin Robbins Curtis
Felix Frankfurter
Melville Fuller – did not graduate; Chief Justice
Ruth Bader Ginsburg – graduated from Columbia Law School
Neil Gorsuch
Horace Gray
Oliver Wendell Holmes Jr.
Ketanji Brown Jackson
Elena Kagan
Anthony Kennedy
William Henry Moody – did not graduate
Lewis F. Powell Jr. – LL.M. graduate
John Roberts – Chief Justice
Edward Terry Sanford
Antonin Scalia
David Souter
 Yale Law School – 11 alumni, 9 graduates
Samuel Alito
Henry Billings Brown – also studied law at Harvard, did not receive law degree from either
David Davis
Abe Fortas
Brett Kavanaugh
Sherman Minton – LL.M. graduate, attended Indiana University
George Shiras Jr. – did not graduate
Sonia Sotomayor
Potter Stewart
Clarence Thomas
Byron White
 Columbia Law School – 7 alumni, 4 graduates
Benjamin N. Cardozo – completed two years, did not graduate
William O. Douglas
Ruth Bader Ginsburg – also attended Harvard Law School
Charles Evans Hughes – Chief Justice
Joseph McKenna – studied at the law school, did not graduate
Stanley Forman Reed – also attended University of Virginia School of Law, did not graduate from either
Harlan F. Stone – Chief Justice

Three justices
 University of Michigan Law School
George Sutherland
Frank Murphy
William Rufus Day
 Litchfield Law School (defunct)
Henry Baldwin
Ward Hunt
Levi Woodbury – first justice to have attended law school

Two justices
 Albany Law School
David J. Brewer
Robert H. Jackson –  completed one-year program, awarded certificate of completion
 Cincinnati Law School (University of Cincinnati College of Law)
Willis Van Devanter
William Howard Taft – Chief Justice (and former President)
 Cumberland School of Law
Howell Edmunds Jackson
Horace Harmon Lurton
 Indiana University Maurer School of Law
Sherman Minton
Wiley Rutledge – studied part-time before leaving and completing degree at University of Colorado Law School
 Northwestern University School of Law
Arthur Goldberg
John Paul Stevens
 Stanford Law School
Sandra Day O'Connor
William Rehnquist – Chief Justice
 University of Virginia School of Law
James Clark McReynolds
Stanley Forman Reed – also attended Columbia Law School, did not graduate from either
 Washington and Lee University School of Law
Joseph Rucker Lamar
Lewis F. Powell Jr. – also received an LL.M. from Harvard Law School

One justice
 Centre College School of Law
 Fred M. Vinson – Chief Justice
 Howard University School of Law
 Thurgood Marshall
 Mitchell Hamline School of Law then known as St. Paul College of Law
 Warren E. Burger – Chief Justice
 New York Law School
 John Marshall Harlan II
 Notre Dame Law School
 Amy Coney Barrett
 Transylvania University School of Law
 John Marshall Harlan
 Tulane University Law School
 Edward White – Chief Justice
 University of Alabama School of Law
 Hugo Black
 University of California, Berkeley School of Law
 Earl Warren – Chief Justice
 University of Colorado Law School
 Wiley Rutledge – originally studied at Indiana University prior to attending the University of Colorado
 University of Missouri–Kansas City School of Law
 Charles Evans Whittaker
 University of Pennsylvania Law School
 Owen Roberts
 University of Texas School of Law
 Tom C. Clark

University or college trained

These justices were educated at the equivalent of what would today be an undergraduate level, but did not receive legal education at the graduate level, the model under which law schools in the U.S. are currently organized.

 Brigham Young University
 George Sutherland – also attended University of Michigan Law School
 Carleton College
 Pierce Butler
 Case Western Reserve University
 John Hessin Clarke
 College of William & Mary
 John Marshall – Chief Justice
 Philip P. Barbour
 Bushrod Washington
 John Blair Jr.
 Columbia University
 John Jay – Chief Justice
 Samuel Blatchford
 Dartmouth College
Salmon P. Chase – Chief Justice
 Dickinson College
Robert Cooper Grier
Roger B. Taney – Chief Justice
 Emory University
 Lucius Quintus Cincinnatus Lamar
 Harvard University
 John McLean
 Joseph Story
 Middlebury College
 Samuel Nelson
 Princeton University 
 Oliver Ellsworth – Chief Justice
 William Paterson
 Mahlon Pitney
 James Moore Wayne
 Rutgers University
 Joseph P. Bradley
 Saint Joseph's University
 Joseph McKenna – also took law courses at Columbia Law School but was not enrolled in a degree program
 University of Georgia
 John Archibald Campbell
 University of Michigan
 William R. Day
 University of St Andrews
 James Wilson – also attended the University of Edinburgh and University of Glasgow but did not graduate
 Washington and Lee University
 Thomas Todd
 Wesleyan University
 David J. Brewer – 1851–1854, transferred to and graduated from Yale
 Williams College
 Stephen Johnson Field
 Yale University
 David J. Brewer – transferred from Wesleyan University
 William Strong

No university legal education
Some justices received no legal education in a university setting, but were instead either trained through apprenticeships or were self-taught, as was common with many lawyers prior to the mid-20th century.

 James F. Byrnes
 John Catron
 Samuel Chase
 Nathan Clifford
 James Iredell
 Thomas Johnson
 Samuel Freeman Miller

See also
 List of law schools in the United States

References

 
 source for seat information
 
 PDF (28 kB)
 source for term of active service

Law schools in the United States
United States law-related lists
Lists of United States Supreme Court justices